Jason Canovas is a sound editor.

Canovas was nominated for an Academy Award for Best Sound Editing at the 87th Academy Awards for his work on the film The Hobbit: The Battle of the Five Armies, his nomination was shared with Brent Burge.
He supports Tranmere Rovers.

References

External links

British sound editors
Living people
Year of birth missing (living people)
Place of birth missing (living people)